Below is a list of selected paintings by the French artist Jacques-Louis David.

References
 Translated from the equivalent article on Russian Wikipedia plus additional entries

David, Jacques-Louis